Toyota Center is a multi-purpose arena in Houston, Texas opened in 2003. The venue has hosted many local, regional and international artists, spanning a wide range of musical genres. A list of notable concerts are given in the table below, with other non-concert entertainment events also included. All events are arranged in a chronological order.

2000s
2003

2004

2005

2006

2007

2008

2009

2010s
2010

2011

2012

2013

2014

2015

2016

2017

2018

2019

2020s
2020

2021

2022

2023

References

External links
 Toyota Center – events

Concerts at Toyota Center
Concerts at Toyota Center
Entertainment events in the United States
Events in Houston
Lists of concerts and performances by location
Lists of events by venue
Lists of events in the United States